Phytophthora uliginosa is a non-papillate homothallic plant pathogen that mainly infects European oak. It differs from other species of the genus (like P. fragariae) by its large oogonia with exclusively paragynous antheridia and the predominant occurrence of ellipsoid sporangia with markedly wide exit pores. P. uliginosa is separated from P. europaea by its larger oogonia without tapering bases and its greater aggressiveness on Quercus robur.

References

Further reading

uliginosa
Water mould plant pathogens and diseases
Tree diseases
Protists described in 2002